Milton railway station is located on the Main line in Queensland, Australia. It serves the Brisbane suburb of Milton. The station includes a walkbridge to Lang Park and is also immediately adjacent the Castlemaine Perkins brewery.

History

Milton station opened in 1884. The station was rebuilt in 1960 as part of the quadruplication of the line.

In June 2010, the Queensland Government approved mixed-use development at Milton station, which will see the station covered with office and apartment buildings.

Milton station will get a new ticketing office, updated public amenities, increased visibility across platforms and new access points off Milton Road and Railway Terrace. The new apartments are called The Milton Residences & will be a part of Queensland's first transit oriented development. Work commenced in October 2014.

Services
Milton is served by City network services operating from Nambour, Caboolture, Kippa-Ring and Bowen Hills to Springfield Central, Ipswich and Rosewood.

Services by platform

*Note: One weekday morning service (4:56am from Central) and selected afternoon peak services continue through to Rosewood.  At all other times, a change of train is required at Ipswich.

References

External links

Milton station Queensland Rail
Milton station Queensland's Railways on the Internet

Milton, Queensland
Railway stations in Australia opened in 1884
Railway stations in Brisbane
Main Line railway, Queensland